Ojstro is a settlement in the Municipality of Laško in eastern Slovenia. It lies in hills east of Laško. The area is part of the traditional region of Styria. It is now included with the rest of the municipality in the Savinja Statistical Region.

A small chapel-shrine in the settlement dates to the 19th century.

References

External links
Ojstro on Geopedia

Populated places in the Municipality of Laško